Ghoreybeh (also Romanized as Gharaibeh, Gharībeh, and Ghoraibeh; also known as Nahr-e Ghereybeh, Nahr-e Ghoreybeh, Qarīheh, Qaşabeh, Qoreybe‘, Qoreybeh, and Qusibeh) is a village in Hoseyni Rural District, in the Central District of Shadegan County, Khuzestan Province, Iran. At the 2006 census, its population was 468, in 76 families.

References 

Populated places in Shadegan County